Divénié is a town and capital of Divénié District in the Niari region of the Republic of Congo.

Founded in the late 19th century, the town has a colonial church made of brick which was built in 1899. However it is in very poor condition due to poor maintenance.

Jean-Jules Koukou the Congolese actor, author and director of theater is from Divénié.

References

Populated places in the Republic of the Congo